Mount Darnley is a mountain,  high, in the south-central portion of Bristol Island in the South Sandwich Islands off Antarctica. It was charted in 1930 by Discovery Investigations personnel on the Discovery II, who named it for E.R. Darnley.

References

Mountains and hills of South Georgia and the South Sandwich Islands